Cake (or Cake TV) is a children's and how-to television series that originally aired on the KOL's Secret Slumber Party and KEWLopolis lineup on CBS. It was created by Barbara Miller and Maia Terzian, and was produced by DIC Entertainment in association with Brookwell McNamara Entertainment. The series was broadcast from September 16 to December 9, 2006.

Overview
The show revolves around a teenage girl named Cake, who is very much into fashion and arts and crafts. Cake wishes to follow in the footsteps of her Grandma Crystal, who used to design costumes for a famous rock star. In her spare time, Cake also enjoys Irish dance and playing the bagpipes. Her hair was tied in double buns, but in Miracle On Ice: The Case of the Frozen Assets", she wore a different hairstyle. She wears a pink T-shirt during Cake TV filming sessions.

Like Cake, her best friend Miracle Ross also has an eye for fashion and art, except she believes in spending money in order to get the perfect gift rather than making it. In "Miracle On Ice: The Case of the Frozen Assets", she wore a red T-shirt for the Cake TV filming session to match Cake's, but in episodes 2-9, she wore a lavender T-shirt, then a purple one in episodes 10-13.

Amy Carson is a small child who lives in their neighborhood and enjoys cracking jokes and pulling pranks. She wears a green T-shirt during Cake TV filming sessions.

Together they are the hosts of Cake TV, an arts-and-crafts show on public-access television that is taped in Cake's garage. Benjamin Turner, who has no intention of going on camera because of stage fright, is the show's cameraman and director. He wears a blue T-shirt when operating the camera during Cake TV filming sessions.

The garage where Cake TV is produced is filled with Grandma's endless supply of trinkets she used when designing costumes, such as beads, glitter, ribbon, and many other supplies. Cake always has items organized and ready to be grabbed at the studio.

Series taglines
 You Can't Buy Individuality, But You Can Make It!
PARTYTIME
Permission Always Required, Take Your Time, Imagination Means Everything.
 It's a Piece of Cake!
 Like It? ... Love it!
 What time is it? It's Party Time!
 See you next time on "Cake TV"
 Hi everyone, and welcome/welcome back to the super cool, super creative world of "Cake TV".
 It's "Cake TV" where you can't buy individuality but you can make it. Starring the always glamorous, Miracle, and me, your loveable announcer, Amy. And now here's your host, the girl with the golden glue gun, the girl who always takes the cake, Cake!"

Cast
 Christa B. Allen as Cake
 Anna Maria Perez de Tagle as Miracle Ross
 Keegan McFadden as Benjamin Turner
 Emily Everhard as Amy Carson

Amy Takeover 
After Second Hand Woes aired, There were some plans for a fourteenth episode to air, called “Amy Takeover”. Though the episode was originally going to air in 2007,  there are no plans for the episode to air and the series is most likely Cancelled or stopped airing.

Production and broadcast
Cake was one of two live-action series slated for CBS's Saturday morning when DIC Entertainment took over supplying content to CBS from Nickelodeon in March 2006. The series was created by Barbara Miller and Maia Terzian.

Cake was taped at Raleigh Studios in Hollywood, California. Cake ended its airings on CBS after three years, when the network began the Cookie Jar TV block in September 2009.

Episodes

References

External links
 

2006 American television series debuts
2006 American television series endings
2000s American children's television series
2000s American teen sitcoms
American children's education television series
Arts and crafts television series
English-language television shows
CBS original programming
Television series about teenagers
Television series by Brookwell McNamara Entertainment
Television series by DIC Entertainment
Television series by DHX Media
Television series about television